Benjamin Thomas Charles Gladwin (born 8 June 1992) is an English footballer who plays as a midfielder for League Two club Crawley Town.

Gladwin has played for 11 clubs including Swindon Town (three previous spells), Queens Park Rangers, Blackburn Rovers and Milton Keynes Dons.

Career

Swindon Town
After three years with JMA Reading FC at John Madejski Academy, Gladwin spent time playing for various non-League football teams such as AFC Wallingford, Hayes & Yeading United and Windsor & Eton, Gladwin moved into professional football when Swindon Town signed the midfielder from Marlow in November 2013.

Gladwin made his debut for Swindon on 10 December 2013, in a 1–1 draw at home to Stevenage in the EFL Trophy. His first goal for the club came the following season, in a 3–2 loss against Plymouth Argyle in the same competition. On 14 April 2015, Gladwin scored a first-half hat-trick in a 4–2 win away to Rochdale. On 11 May 2015, Gladwin scored twice in Swindon's 5–5 draw with Sheffield United in the Football League play-offs, but Swindon went on to lose in the final 4–0 against Preston North End.

Queens Park Rangers
On 28 May 2015, Gladwin and Swindon Town teammate Massimo Luongo, joined Queens Park Rangers, both players signing on a three-year deal for an undisclosed fee.

On 12 August 2015, Gladwin made his competitive QPR debut in a 0–3 win against Yeovil Town in the first round of the 2015–16 Football League Cup. On 10 January 2017, Gladwin moved to Swindon Town for a second loan spell until the end of the season.

Blackburn Rovers
On 28 June 2017, Gladwin joined League One side Blackburn Rovers on a two-year deal. In November 2017, Gladwin suffered an injury for which he required surgery that ruled him out of play until February 2018. On 2 January 2020 he was released.

Milton Keynes Dons
Gladwin signed for Milton Keynes Dons on 10 January 2020 on a short-term deal. Despite several positive performances, he was initially one of nine players released by the club after the conclusion of the 2019–20 season. However, on 28 July 2020 the club announced Gladwin had returned and re-signed ahead of the 2020–21 campaign.

Swindon Town return
Gladwin returned to Swindon Town on 26 July 2021 on a free transfer signing a one-year contract. On 20 January 2022, Gladwin signed a new contract to keep him at the club beyond the end of the season.

Crawley Town
On 27 January 2023, Gladwin signed for Crawley Town for an undisclosed fee on an eighteen-month contract.

Career statistics

References

External links
 

Living people
1992 births
Sportspeople from Reading, Berkshire
English footballers
Association football defenders
Association football midfielders
Wallingford Town F.C. players
Hayes & Yeading United F.C. players
Salisbury City F.C. players
Windsor & Eton F.C. players
Burnham F.C. players
Reading Town F.C. players
Marlow F.C. players
Swindon Town F.C. players
Queens Park Rangers F.C. players
Bristol City F.C. players
Milton Keynes Dons F.C. players
Crawley Town F.C. players
National League (English football) players
Southern Football League players
English Football League players
Footballers from Berkshire